The Raymond Souster Award is a Canadian literary award, presented by the League of Canadian Poets to a book judged as the best work of poetry by a Canadian poet in the previous year.

The award was presented for the first time in 2013, and was named in honour of Canadian poet Raymond Souster.

Nominees and winners

References

Awards established in 2013
2013 establishments in Canada
Canadian poetry awards